Faizan Asif (born 21 December 1992) is a Pakistani-born cricketer who played for the United Arab Emirates national cricket team. He made his Twenty20 International debut for the United Arab Emirates against the Netherlands on 17 March 2014. In October 2019, he was added to the UAE's squad for the 2019 ICC T20 World Cup Qualifier tournament, replacing Ashfaq Ahmed.

References

External links
 

1992 births
Living people
Emirati cricketers
United Arab Emirates Twenty20 International cricketers
Pakistani emigrants to the United Arab Emirates
Pakistani expatriate sportspeople in the United Arab Emirates
Place of birth missing (living people)